is a railway station in the Yotsuya district of Shinjuku, Tokyo, Japan, operated jointly by East Japan Railway Company (JR East) and Tokyo Metro. Several parts of the station are also located in the Rokubancho and Kojimachi neighborhoods of Chiyoda ward.

Lines
Yotsuya Station is served by the JR East Chūō Main Line with both Chūō Line (Rapid) and Chūō-Sōbu Line local services stopping here.

It is also served by the Tokyo Metro Marunouchi Line (station number M-12) and Tokyo Metro Namboku Line (station number N-08) subway lines.

All four lines at Yotsuya run north to south; however, the Chūō/Chūō-Sōbu Line and Marunouchi Line are mainly east–west lines, and somewhat counter-intuitively, while northbound Chūō Line trains are bound for Tokyo and southbound trains are bound for Shinjuku, northbound Marunouchi Line trains are bound for Shinjuku and southbound trains are bound for Tokyo.

Station layout

JR East
The JR East part of the station consists of two island platforms serving four tracks. The station has a "Midori no Madoguchi" staffed ticket counter and "View Plaza" travel agency.

Tokyo Metro
The Marunouchi Line station is elevated with two side platforms serving two tracks. The Namboku Line station is underground with one island platform serving two tracks.

History
Yotsuya Station opened on 9 September 1894 as a station on the Kobu Railway, the forerunner of the Chūō Line which was nationalized in 1906. Although the line was originally single-track, the section passing through Yotsuya was double-tracked in 1895 and quadruple-tracked in 1929.

The Marunouchi Line station opened on 15 March 1959, and the Namboku Line station opened on 26 March 1996. Yotsuya was the southern terminus of the Namboku Line until the opening of Tameike-Sannō Station in 1997.

The station facilities of the Marunouchi and Namboku Lines were inherited by Tokyo Metro after the privatization of the Teito Rapid Transit Authority (TRTA) in 2004.

Passenger statistics
In fiscal 2013, the JR East station was used by an average of 92,431 passengers daily (boarding passengers only), making it the 45th-busiest station operated by JR East. In fiscal 2013, the Tokyo Metro station was used by an average of 110,217 passengers per day (exiting and entering passengers), making it the 27th-busiest station operated by Tokyo Metro. The average daily passenger figures for each operator in previous years are as shown below.

 Note that JR East figures are for boarding passengers only.

Surrounding area
The station is situated in the Yotsuya neighborhood on the boundary between Shinjuku and Chiyoda wards.

 Akasaka Palace
 Kioi Hall
 St. Ignatius Church

Universities and schools
 Sophia University
 Tokyo Chinese School
 Yotsuya Elementary School
 Nichibei Kaiwa Gakuin
 Nichibei Kaiwa Gakuin - Japanese Language Institute

Hotels
 Hotel New Otani
 Mitsui Garden Hotel Yotsuya

References

External links

 Yotsuya Station information (JR East) 
 Yotsuya Station information (Tokyo Metro) 

Railway stations in Japan opened in 1894
Chūō-Sōbu Line
Stations of East Japan Railway Company
Railway stations in Tokyo
Tokyo Metro Marunouchi Line
Tokyo Metro Namboku Line